Cairnie Junction railway station served the village of Cairnie, Aberdeenshire, Scotland from 1898 to 1968 on the Great North of Scotland Railway.

History 
The station opened on 1 June 1898 by the Great North of Scotland Railway. The station closed to both passengers and goods traffic on 6 May 1968.

References

External links 

Disused railway stations in Aberdeenshire
Former Great North of Scotland Railway stations
Railway stations in Great Britain opened in 1897
Railway stations in Great Britain closed in 1968
1897 establishments in Scotland
1968 disestablishments in Scotland
Beeching closures in Scotland